Milton Rogério Harassen do Ó (born 24 February 1979) is a Brazilian retired footballer who played professionally as a defender in Brazil, Portugal and Turkey, and is the current manager.

A native of Ponta Grossa, the second-largest city in southern Brazil's state of Paraná, Milton do Ó had a minor stint in the early 2000s in Turkey's Süper Lig. He returned home to play with a number of Brazilian clubs, and while a member of Rio de Janeiro's Fluminense, signed with the Portuguese club CS Marítimo (2005–07).

Milton do Ó played for Brazil at the 1999 FIFA World Youth Championship in Nigeria.

References

External links
Profile at Foradejogo
Profile at Turkish Football Federation

1979 births
Living people
Brazilian footballers
Brazilian football managers
Brazilian expatriate footballers
Primeira Liga players
Süper Lig players
Expatriate footballers in Portugal
Expatriate footballers in Turkey
People from Ponta Grossa
Association football defenders
Brazil under-20 international footballers
Paraná Clube players
Club Athletico Paranaense players
Goiás Esporte Clube players
Samsunspor footballers
Madureira Esporte Clube players
Esporte Clube Vitória players
Associação Atlética Internacional (Limeira) players
Fluminense FC players
C.S. Marítimo players
C.D. Trofense players
FC Cascavel managers
Sportspeople from Paraná (state)